Events from the year 1852 in Germany.

Events

Incumbents

 King of Bavaria – Maximilian II
 King of Hanover – George V
 King of Prussia – Frederick William IV
 King of Saxony – Frederick Augustus II

Births 

 January 11 – Constantin Fehrenbach, Chancellor of Germany (d. 1926)
 May 2 – Max von Gallwitz , German general (d. 1937 )
 
 May 31 -Julius Richard Petri , German bacteriologist (d. 1921 )
 
 June 25 - Friedrich Loeffler , German bacteriologist (d. 1915 )
 
 October 9 – Emil Fischer , German chemist, Nobel Prize laureate (d. 1919 ) December 10

Felix Graf von Bothmer , German general (d. 1937 )

 December 19 – Albert A. Michelson , German-born physicist, Nobel Prize laureate (d. 1931 )

Deaths 
 June 21 – Friedrich Fröbel, German pedagogue (b. 1782)
 
 October 15 – Friedrich Ludwig Jahn , German gymnastics educator (b. 1778 )
 
 November 17 – Adam Karl August von Eschenmayer , German philosopher (b. 1768 )

 
Years of the 19th century in Germany
Germany
Germany